The 2021 Internationaux de Tennis de Vendée was a professional tennis tournament played on hard courts. It was the eighth edition of the tournament which was part of the 2021 ATP Challenger Tour. It took place in Mouilleron-le-Captif, France between 4 and 10 October 2021.

Singles main-draw entrants

Seeds

 1 Rankings are as of 27 September 2021.

Other entrants
The following players received wildcards into the singles main draw:
  Arthur Fils
  Kyrian Jacquet
  Harold Mayot

The following player received entry into the singles main draw as an alternate:
  Constant Lestienne

The following players received entry from the qualifying draw:
  Zizou Bergs
  Titouan Droguet
  Evgeny Karlovskiy
  Mats Rosenkranz

The following player received entry as a lucky loser:
  Kenny de Schepper

Champions

Singles

  Jiří Veselý def.  Norbert Gombos 6–4, 6–4.

Doubles

  Jonathan Eysseric /  Quentin Halys def.  David Pel /  Aisam-ul-Haq Qureshi 4–6, 7–6(7–5), [10–8].

References

2021 ATP Challenger Tour
2021
2021 in French tennis
October 2021 sports events in France